The 16th European Badminton Championships were held in Sofia, Bulgaria, between 18  and 25 April 1998, and hosted by the European Badminton Union and the Bulgarian Badminton Federation.

Venue
The competition was held at the Winter Sports Palace in Sofia.

Medalists

Results

Semi-finals

Finals

Notes

Medal account

References

External links 
Annals of Badminton Europe
tournamentsoftware.com

European Badminton Championships
European Badminton Championships
European Badminton Championships
1998 European Badminton Championships
Badminton tournaments in Bulgaria
Sports competitions in Sofia
1990s in Sofia